Marcel Carfantan (born 21 February 1933) is a French racing cyclist. He rode in the 1957 Tour de France.

References

1933 births
Living people
French male cyclists
Place of birth missing (living people)